Marcin Horbacz (born June 16, 1974 in Koszalin) is a Polish modern pentathlete. He is also a two-time champion at the 2007 and 2009 World Cup circuit, and is currently ranked no. 106 in the world by the Union Internationale de Pentathlon Moderne (UIPM).

Horbacz first competed for the men's modern pentathlon at the 2004 Summer Olympics in Athens. He displayed a strong performance in the early rounds of the competition, including his sixth place-finish in one-touch épée fencing. He was second overall at the start of the show jumping segment, but dropped to last when his horse stubbornly refused to jump the last obstacle. Following a discontinuous jump, Horbacz finished last out of thirty-two competitors in the overall event, with a score of 4,388 points.

At the 2008 Summer Olympics in Beijing, Horbacz qualified as a 34-year-old for the second time in men's modern pentathlon, along with his teammate Bartosz Majewski. During the competition, Horbacz made a strong showing in the pistol shooting segment by hitting a total of 185 targets. Unlike his previous Olympics, he struggled to maintain his position in épée fencing and freestyle swimming, but managed to improve his performance by lessening obstacle and time penalties in the riding segment. In the end, Horbacz successfully finished the event in thirteenth place with a score of 5,344 points.

References

External links
UIPM Profile
NBC 2008 Olympics profile 

Polish male modern pentathletes
1974 births
Living people
Olympic modern pentathletes of Poland
Modern pentathletes at the 2004 Summer Olympics
Modern pentathletes at the 2008 Summer Olympics
People from Koszalin
Sportspeople from West Pomeranian Voivodeship